The United States officially recognized the independence of Ukraine on December 25, 1991. The United States upgraded its consulate in the capital, Kyiv, to embassy status on January 21, 1992. In 2002, relations between the United States and Ukraine deteriorated after one of the recordings made during the Cassette Scandal revealed an alleged transfer of a sophisticated Ukrainian defense system to Saddam Hussein's Iraq. Following the 2014 annexation of Crimea by the Russian Federation, the USA became one of the largest defense partners of Ukraine.

The current ambassador of the United States to Ukraine is Bridget A. Brink. The current Ukrainian Ambassador to the United States is Oksana Markarova.

As of 2009, the United States supports Ukraine's bid to join NATO.

According to documents uncovered during the United States diplomatic cables leak, American diplomats defend Ukrainian sovereignty in meetings with other diplomats.

Ukrainians have generally viewed the U.S. positively, with 80% expressing a favorable view in 2002, and 60% in 2011. According to the 2012 U.S. Global Leadership Report, 33% of Ukrainians approve of U.S. leadership, with 26% disapproving and 41% uncertain.

In the wake of Russia's annexation of Crimea, the United States began to supply military aid to Ukraine. This continued after the 2022 Russian invasion of Ukraine with the US massively increasing its supply of military aid,  with US President Joe Biden heavily condemning the invasion and pledging support to Ukraine. In December 2022, during a surprise visit to Washington, President Zelenskyy gave a speech to a joint session of Congress. He thanked the Congress and the American people for the support, and stated the resolve for victory in the war.

History of relations

Informal relations between the United States and Ukrainian nationalists date back to the early days of the Cold War, when the Central Intelligence Agency (CIA) cooperated with the Ukrainian independence movement in the Soviet Union, many of whom were former fascist collaborators. In the early 1950s, the CIA dropped nearly 85 Ukrainian agents in a clandestine operation over Soviet territory, where they were supposed to spark a nationalist uprising in the Ukrainian Soviet Socialist Republic. The operation proved a failure, however, and two-thirds of the agents were immediately captured or killed. The Americans, however, did not realize the failure of the operation until several years later.

The United States enjoys cordially friendly and strategic relations with independent Ukraine and attaches great importance to the success of Ukraine's transition to a democracy with a flourishing market economy. Following a period of economic decline characterized by high inflation and a continued reliance on state controls, the Ukrainian government began taking steps in the fall of 1999 to reinvigorate economic reform that had been stalled for years due to a lack of a reform majority in the Ukrainian parliament. The Ukrainian government's stated determination to implement comprehensive economic reform is a welcome development in the eyes of the US government, and the U.S. is committed to supporting Ukraine in continuing on this path. Bilateral relations suffered a setback in September 2002 when the federal government of the U.S. announced it had authenticated a recording of President Leonid Kuchma's July 2000 decision to transfer a Kolchuga early warning system to Iraq. The Government of Ukraine denied that the transfer had occurred. Ukraine's democratic Orange Revolution has led to closer cooperation and more open dialogue between Ukraine and the United States. U.S. policy remains centered on realizing and strengthening a democratic, prosperous, a primary recipient of FSA assistance. Total U.S. assistance since independence has been more than $3 billion. U.S. assistance to Ukraine is targeted to promote political and economic reform and to address urgent humanitarian needs. The U.S. has consistently encouraged Ukraine's transition to a democratic society with a prosperous market-based economy.

In November 2006, the Millennium Challenge Corporation (MCC) selected Ukraine to be eligible to apply for compact assistance. Ukraine already participates in the MCC Threshold Program, and in December 2006 signed a $45 million Threshold Program agreement. This program, which began implementation in early 2007, aims to reduce corruption in the public sector through civil society monitoring and advocacy, judicial reform, increased government monitoring and enforcement of ethical and administrative standards, streamlining and enforcing regulations, and combating corruption in higher education. Ukraine is beginning the process of developing a Compact proposal, and successful implementation of the Threshold Program will be necessary before the MCC will enter into a Compact with Ukraine.

The U.S. maintains an embassy in the Ukrainian capital Kyiv, and Ukraine maintains an embassy in the American capital Washington, D.C.

In addition to diplomatic support in its conflict with Russia, the U.S. provided Ukraine with US$1.5 billion in military aid from 2014 to 2019. In 2021, The Sunday Times reported that the amount of military aid given was US$2.5 billion.

In January 2022, the U.S. put 5,000–8,500 troops on high alert as tensions escalated in the Russo-Ukrainian War, expressing willingness to further help defend Ukraine before and when Russia launched its invasion a month later. The United States provided nearly $1 billion in military aid to Ukraine in 2021 and 2022, up to the first week of the invasion. Such aid included offensive weapons and sharing intelligence with the Ukrainian military. Ukrainian President Volodymyr Zelenskyy has repeatedly sent thanks to American leaders for the support.

In the 2022 State of the Union Address, which was attended by Ukrainian Ambassador Oksana Markarova, U.S. President Joe Biden heavily criticized the invasion and pledged American support for Ukraine. American public opinion also heavily shifted towards supporting Ukraine following the invasion.

In May 2022, the U.S. Senate confirmed Bridget Brink to serve as ambassador to coincide with the reopening of the US embassy in Kyiv after it had closed due to the invasion. On December 21, 2022 Zelenskyy made his first foreign trip since the invasion to Washington DC. After meeting with President Biden, he gave a speech to a joint session of congress. The speech included references to FDR's declaration of war on Japan and thanked the American congress and people for their support of Ukraine. On the 20th of February 2023, President Biden conducted an unannounced visit of Kyiv.

Controversies
During the Ukrainian independence movement, on August 1, 1991, then-U.S.-President George H. W. Bush made a speech critical of the movement which James Carafano subsequently described as "what may have been the worst speech ever by an American chief executive".

On 18 February 2009 the Verkhovna Rada of Crimea sent a letter to the Cabinet of Ministers of Ukraine and the President of Ukraine in which it stated that it deemed it inexpedient to open a representative office of the United States in Crimea and it urged the Ukrainian leadership to give up this idea. The letter will also be sent to the Chairman of the UN General Assembly. The letter was passed in a 77 to 9 roll-call vote with one abstention.

In 2012 the United States Senate Committee on Foreign Relations passed Resolution 466, calling for the unconditional release of political prisoner Yulia Tymoshenko and implemented a visa ban against those responsible. The resolution condemned the administration of Ukrainian President Viktor Yanukovych (in office: 2010–2014) and asked NATO to suspend all cooperative agreements with Ukraine. In response, First Deputy General Prosecutor of Ukraine Renat Kuzmin wrote a letter to U.S. President Barack Obama, complaining that his visa was revoked.

Following the success of the Euromaidan protests, United States Assistant Secretary of State Victoria Nuland stated that the United States had "invested" $5 billion to bring about a "secure and prosperous and democratic Ukraine." The Euromaidan resulted in the election of the pro-EU president Petro Poroshenko and then the Annexation of Crimea by the Russian Federation in 2014. Poroshenko requested military aid from the United States. President Barack Obama was reluctant to arm a relatively corrupt military that was recently used against anti-democracy protestors, and saw the mistaken shoot-down of Malaysia Airlines Flight 17 by Russian-armed separatists as an example of the dangers of supplying arms to Ukraine. Though the U.S. had sanctioned Russia and refused to recognize the annexation, after a year Obama declined to provide the requested lethal aid (such as FGM-148 Javelin anti-tank missiles and F-16 fighter jets. The Obama administration did supply $600 million of non-lethal military aid from 2014 to 2016, including vehicles, training, body armor, and night-vision goggles.

In 2017, President Donald Trump approved $47 million of Javelin anti-tank missile and missile launchers; these were not allowed to be deployed but kept in storage as a strategic deterrent against Russian invasion.

In 2018 the U.S. House of Representatives passed a provision blocking any training of Azov Battalion of the Ukrainian National Guard by American forces, citing its neo-Nazi background. In previous years, between 2014 and 2017, the U.S. House of Representatives passed amendments banning support of Azov, but due to pressure from the Pentagon, the amendments were quietly lifted.

On April 25, 2018, 57 members of the House of Representatives, led by Ro Khanna, released a condemnation of Holocaust distortion in Ukraine. They criticized Ukraine's 2015 memory laws glorifying Ukrainian Insurgent Army (UPA) and its leaders, such as Roman Shukhevych. The condemnation came in an open bipartisan letter to Deputy Secretary of State John Sullivan.

In summer 2019, Trump froze $400 million in military aid to Ukraine which had been approved by Congress, an aid package which was the subject of a phone conversation that Trump had with Ukrainian President Volodymyr Zelenskyy on July 25. On August 12, 2019, an anonymous whistleblower submitted a complaint to U.S. Inspector General Michael Atkinson that stated that Trump had allegedly attempted to pressure Zelenskyy into launching an investigation on former U.S. Vice President Joe Biden and his son, Hunter, during the phone call. On September 24, 2019, the United States House of Representatives initiated an impeachment inquiry against Trump. Trump held a meeting with Zelenskyy in New York City on September 25 where both presidents stated that Zelenskyy had not been pressured during the July phone call and that nothing out of the ordinary had occurred. Trump was impeached by the House, but later acquitted in the Senate trial and continued as President until the end of his term.

From May 2019 to May 2022 the USA did not have an ambassador to Ukraine.

The United States had pledged $2.175 billion in military aid to Ukraine, which included the Ground Launched Small Diameter Bomb (GLSDB), a new rocket doubling the country's strike range in its conflict with Russia. The aid package also funded other weapons and equipment, such as air defense firing units, counter-drone systems, and precision-guided munitions. Since the invasion by Russian forces, the United States had pledged over $29.3 billion in security assistance to Ukraine.
In early February 2023, 11 House Republicans introduced what they called the "Ukraine Fatigue" resolution, calling on Biden to end military and financial aid to Ukraine while pressuring Ukraine and Russia to agree on a peace agreement.

Sister/twinning cities
  Bohodukhiv, Kharkiv region –  Boyertown, Pennsylvania
  Brovary, Kyiv region –  Rockford, Illinois
  Chernivtsi –  Salt Lake City, Utah
  Chyhyryn, Cherkasy region –  Sebastopol, California
  Dolyna, Ivano-Frankivsk region –  Prairie Village, Kansas
  Donetsk –  Pittsburgh, Pennsylvania
  Drohobych, Lviv region –  Muscatine, Iowa and Buffalo, New York
  Horlivka, Donetsk region –  Pensacola, Florida and Buffalo, New York
  Ivano-Frankivsk –  Arlington County, Virginia
  Kalush, Ivano-Frankivsk region –  Grand Prairie, Texas
  Kaniv, Cherkasy region –  Sonoma, California
  Kharkiv –  Cincinnati, Ohio
  Khmelnyskyi –  Modesto, California
  Krasnodon, Luhansk region –  –  Birmingham, Alabama
  Kyiv –  Chicago, Illinois
  Lviv –  Corning, New York and Parma, Ohio
  Odesa –  Baltimore, Maryland
  Poltava –  Irondequoit, New York
  Smila, Cherkasy region –  Newton, Iowa
  Tysmenytsia, Ivano-Frankivsk region –  Bandera, Texas
  Uzhhorod, Zakarpattia region –  Corvallis, Oregon
  Vinnytsia –  Birmingham, Alabama

Agreements and memorandums
  Bakhmut, Donetsk region –  Omaha, Nebraska
  Berdiansk, Zaporizhzhia region –  Lowell, Massachusetts
  Berezhany, Ternopil region –  Wethersfield, Connecticut
  Cherkasy –  Des Moines, Iowa and Santa Rosa, California
  Kalush, Ivano-Frankivsk region –  Little Rock, Arkansas
  Kamianets-Podilskyi, Khmelnytskyi region –  Athens, Georgia
  Kherson –  Kent, Washington
  Horishni Plavni, Poltava region –  Ithaca, New York
  Konotop, Sumy region –  Helena, Montana and Skokie, Illinois
  Korsun-Shevchenkivskyi, Cherkasy region –  Marshalltown, Iowa
  Kremenchuk, Poltava region –  Providence, Rhode Island
  Myrhorod, Poltava region –  Randolph, Vermont
  Rubizhne, Luhansk region –  Louisville, Kentucky
  Shpola, Cherkasy region –  Oskaloosa, Iowa
  Simferopol, Crimea –  Salem, Oregon
  Slavutych, Kyiv region –  Richland, Washington
  Svitlovodsk Kirovohrad region –  Springfield, Illinois
  Ternopil –  Yonkers, New York
  Uman, Cherkasy region –  Davis, California
  Yalta, Crimea –  Santa Barbara, California

Resident diplomatic missions
 Ukraine has an embassy in Washington, D.C. and consulates-general in Chicago, New York and San Francisco.
 United States has an embassy in Kyiv.

High-level mutual visits

See also 
 Taras Shevchenko Memorial
 Ukrainian Americans
 Transnistria–United States relations
 United States and the 2022 Russian invasion of Ukraine

References
 available here

Further reading
 Beebe, George. "Groupthink Resurgent" National Interest (Jan/Feb 2020), Issue 165, pp 5–10. Explores whether President Trump delayed military assistance to Ukraine in order to press for inappropriate political favors; also examines strategic competition in Ukraine between the West and Vladimir Putin's revanchist Russia. 
 Buskey, Megan. "New Leader, Old Troubles" American Scholar (Winter 2020) 89#1 pp 6–11. re presidents Volodymyr Zelensky and Trump.
 Fedunkiw, Marianne P. "Ukrainian Americans." in Gale Encyclopedia of Multicultural America, edited by Thomas Riggs, (3rd ed., vol. 4, Gale, 2014), pp. 459–474. online
 Petrov, Valentyn V. "‘Grand Strategies’, Military And Political Doctrines Of The United States Of America: Trends Of Evolution After The End Of The Cold War. Lessons For Ukraine." Actual Problems Of International Relations 128 (2017): 40-50. online
 Plokhy, Serhii, and M. E. Sarotte. "The Shoals of Ukraine: Where American Illusions and Great-Power Politics Collide." Foreign Affairs 99 (2020): 81+ excerpt.

External links
History of Ukraine - U.S. relations
Ukrainian American News - Ukrainians in USA 
Center for US-Ukrainian Relations (CUSUR) 

 
United States
Bilateral relations of the United States